Pascal Guyot (born 26 December 1959) is a French former professional racing cyclist. He rode in two editions of the Tour de France.

References

External links

1959 births
Living people
French male cyclists
Sportspeople from Belfort
Cyclists from Bourgogne-Franche-Comté